Pakistan Air Force Museum Faisal is an Air Force museum and park situated near Karsaz Flyover on Shahrah-e-Faisal in Karachi, Sindh, Pakistan.

A majority of the aircraft, weapons and radar are displayed outside in the park but the main museum features all major fighter aircraft that have been used by the Pakistan Air Force. The museum also houses the Vickers VC.1 Viking aircraft used by Mohammed Ali Jinnah, founder of Pakistan, and a Folland Gnat of the Indian Air Force, that landed in Pasrur town, Pakistan in the Indo-Pakistani war of 1965. Also on display are the scale models of some World War I, World War II and some more modern aircraft and photo galleries of almost all the squadrons of Pakistan Air Force.

History 
The museum was established in 1990 in two unused hangars in a remote part of the Base. The museum was expanded significantly from its humble beginnings in the period 1999–2004. Additions include children's playing areas, rides, and eateries.

Management 
The museum is managed by a committee headed by the Air Officer Commanding Southern Air Command; however, it is managed and run by the Administrator. Recently the museum has been renamed as Historical Record & Archives Section and given additional responsibilities for maintaining some documented history of the PAF. The current Administrator of Museum is Air Commodore Syed Ali Zaidi. However, the museum was developed by Wing Commander Syed Salman Ahmed.

Gallery

Selected exhibits 
Some of the aircraft that are preserved in the museum are:

Martin B-57 Canberra
De Havilland Tiger Moth
North American Harvard
Lockheed F-104 Starfighter
North American F-86 Sabre
Dassault Mirage 5
Shenyang F-6
Lockheed T-33
Mikoyan-Gurevich MiG-15
Auster Autocar
Antonov An-26
Antonov An-12
A-26 Invader
U-9 Aero Commander
Vickers Viking
Folland Gnat
Kaman HH-43 Huskie

Besides those from PAF inventory, visitors can see the captured Folland Gnat of Indian Air Force and Afghan Air Force Mig 21 and Iraq Air Force, Antonov An-12.

A statue of Indian Airforce's Wing Commander Abhinandan Varthaman along with the parts of the fuselage and tail of his Mig-21 aircraft are also on display in a gallery named Operation Swift Retort.

See also
List of museums in Pakistan

References

External links

Homepage PAF Museum, Karachi
PAF Museum in Karachi, on YouTube
PAF Falcons Enthusiast

Pakistan Air Force
Aerospace museums
Air force museums
Museums in Karachi
1990 establishments in Pakistan
Tourist attractions in Karachi